Nebria exul is a species of ground beetle in the Nebriinae subfamily that is endemic to Algeria.

References

exul
Beetles described in 1910
Beetles of North Africa
Endemic fauna of Algeria